Jaakko Vainio (14 February 1892, Kurkijoki - 6 June 1953; original surname Repo) was a Finnish journalist and politician. He was a member of the Parliament of Finland from 1922 to 1924, representing the Agrarian League.

References

1892 births
1953 deaths
People from Lakhdenpokhsky District
People from Viipuri Province (Grand Duchy of Finland)
Centre Party (Finland) politicians
Members of the Parliament of Finland (1922–24)